Talisa García (Chile, 1973) is a British actress of Chilean origin. She is best known for her role of Kim Vogel in Baptiste (TV series) and Sofia Perez in Decrypted.

Biography 

She was adopted by a university lecturer and her engineer husband after she was found in the streets of Chile.

In 2003, she completed her master's degree in acting at the Arts Educational School, London.

Filmography

Film

Television

References

External links 

 
 Talisa García's Instagram Account
 Talisa García's Twitter Account

Living people
1973 births
English LGBT actors
Transgender actresses
Chilean LGBT actors
English transgender people
Chilean transgender people